Sinestesia is the third studio album by Indonesian indie band Efek Rumah Kaca, released on December 18, 2015, on Jangan Marah Records. It was produced by Pandai Besi and the band. Recorded between 2009–15, Sinestesia is the band's first release since their 2008 album Kamar Gelap. A few days later, the album released with CD format by Demajors Independent Music Industry. All the singles were written by Cholil Mahmud.

Before releases the album, it was released the first single "Pasar Bisa Diciptakan" on July 10, to radio stations throughout Indonesia. They released the song "Biru", which consists of two songs: "Pasar Bisa Diciptakan" and "Cipta Bisa Dipasarkan" on SoundCloud. On September 18, the band held a concert, titled "Pasar Bisa Dikonserkan" at the Balai Sartika in Bandung, though it caused disappointment due to technical problems. They apologized for the incident. A few days later, they released the song "Putih", consisting of "Tiada" and "Ada", on Ripstore Asia and SoundCloud.

At the 3rd Indonesian Choice Awards, the album subsequently manage to earn a nomination for "Album of the Year", but lose out to Isyana Sarasvati's Explore!.

Critical reception

Sinestesia received generally positive reviews. Rolling Stone Indonesia gave four-and-a-half out of five stars, calling it an "ambitious work that exceeded expectations. Efek Rumah Kaca took six years to work on their third album, Sinestesia, but in the end, it exceeded expectations. All six ambitious songs presented by the trio are over 7 minutes long, displaying a richer palette of instruments, beautiful melodies and lyrics commenting on life."

Track listing

Released history

Awards and nominations

References

External links
 Sinestesia by Efek Rumah Kaca on iTunes

2015 albums
Indonesian-language albums